Pull back or pullback may refer to:

In mathematics
 Pullback, a name given to two different mathematical processes
 Pullback (cohomology), a term in topology
 Pullback (differential geometry), a term in differential geometry
 Pullback (category theory), a term in category theory
 Pullback attractor, an aspect of a random dynamical system
 Pullback bundle, the fiber bundle induced by a map of its base space

Other

 Pull-back, a term in financial trading
 Pullback motor, a clockwork motor often used in toy cars
 Euscirrhopterus poeyi, known as the pullback moth
 Iijima Bishop Pullback, an opening in the game of shogi
 The opposite of a pushback (migration)